The Mishmi giant flying squirrel (Petaurista mishmiensis) is a species of rodent in the family Sciuridae.

References

External links 
 
  – photo of Mishmi giant flying squirrel

Animals described in 2009